Guilherme Dias Massê Basseto (born 12 March 1997) is a Brazilian swimmer.

He was at the 2017 Summer Universiade in Taipei, Taiwan.

He competed in the men's 50 metre backstroke and in the men's 100 metre backstroke events at the 2018 FINA World Swimming Championships (25 m), in Hangzhou, China, reaching the semifinals of both (finished 13th in both).

On 25 April 2021, while swimming the 4x100m mixed medley relay at the Brazilian Olympic Selection Trials, he broke the South American record with a time of 3:45.51, along with Felipe Lima, Giovanna Diamante and Larissa Oliveira.

In June 2021, he qualified to represent Brazil at the 2020 Summer Olympics.

At the 2020 Summer Olympics in Tokyo, he finished 14th in the Mixed 4 × 100 metre medley relay, along with Giovanna Diamante, Felipe Lima and Stephanie Balduccini and 20th in the Men's 100 metre backstroke.

He was at the 2022 World Aquatics Championships held in Budapest, Hungary. In the 4 × 100 metre mixed medley relay, he finished 9th along with Giovanna Diamante, João Gomes Júnior and Stephanie Balduccini. She also finished 10th in the Men's 50 metre backstroke and 10th in the Men's 4 × 100 metre medley relay, along with João Gomes Júnior, Matheus Gonche and Luiz Gustavo Borges.

References

External links
 

1997 births
Living people
Brazilian male backstroke swimmers
Swimmers at the 2020 Summer Olympics
Place of birth missing (living people)
Universiade medalists in swimming
Sportspeople from São Paulo (state)
21st-century Brazilian people
20th-century Brazilian people
Competitors at the 2022 South American Games
South American Games gold medalists for Brazil
South American Games silver medalists for Brazil
South American Games medalists in swimming
Universiade bronze medalists for Brazil
Medalists at the 2019 Summer Universiade